The Port Huron Area School District, in Port Huron, Michigan, United States, contains 16 schools:

Elementary schools
 Cleveland
 Crull
 Garfield
 Indian Woods
 Keewahdin
 Michigamme
 Roosevelt
 Thomas Edison
 Woodrow Wilson

Middle schools
 Central
 Fort Gratiot
 Holland Woods

High schools
 Harrison Center
 Port Huron
 Port Huron Northern
Closed Schools
Kimball Elementary closed 2019
Lakeport Elementary closed 2014
Sparlingville Elementary closed 2010
Chippewa Middle School 2011
Jefferson Adult Learning Center closed 2009
Grant Learning Center Closed 2010
Washington Junior High closed ?1980

School districts in Michigan
Education in St. Clair County, Michigan